A Void, translated from the original French  ( "The Disappearance"), is a 300-page French lipogrammatic novel, written in 1969 by Georges Perec, entirely without using the letter e, following Oulipo constraints.

Translations
It was translated into English by Gilbert Adair, with the title A Void, for which he won the Scott Moncrieff Prize in 1995.
Three other English translations are titled A Vanishing by Ian Monk, Vanish'd! by John Lee, and Omissions  by Julian West.

All translators have imposed upon themselves a similar lipogrammatic constraint to the original, avoiding the most commonly used letter of the alphabet. The Spanish version contains no a, which is the second most commonly used letter in the Spanish language (first being e), while the Russian version contains no о. The Japanese version does not use syllables containing the sound "i" (etc.) at all.

Plot summary
A Void plot follows a group of individuals looking for a missing companion, Anton Vowl. It is in part a parody of noir and horror fiction, with many stylistic tricks, gags, plot twists, and a grim conclusion. On many occasions it implicitly talks about its own lipogrammatic limitation, highlighting its unusual syntax.  A Void protagonists finally work out which symbol is missing, but find it a hazardous topic to discuss, as any who try to bypass this story's constraint risk dying. Philip Howard, writing a lipogrammatic appraisal of A Void in his column Lost Words, said "This is a story chock-full of plots and sub-plots, of loops within loops, of trails in pursuit of trails, all of which allow its author an opportunity to display his customary virtuosity as an avant-gardist magician, acrobat and clown."

Major themes
Both of Georges Perec's parents perished in World War II: his father as a soldier and his mother in the Holocaust. He was brought up by his aunt and uncle after surviving the war. Warren Motte interprets the absence of the letter e in the book as a metaphor for Perec's own sense of loss and incompleteness:

Versions

See also

 Gadsby, another novel without the letter e
 Le Train de Nulle Part, a novel without any verbs

References

External links
 Bibliography of secondary works on La Disparition
 Brief excerpt from the Adair translation
 Preface in French
 Review by Danny Yee
 News about the Turkish translation
 https://web.archive.org/web/20130124122327/http://magazines.russ.ru/nlo/2010/106/ about translation in Russian
 Collection of book covers for translations of La Disparition

Novels by Georges Perec
1969 novels
Lipograms
Metafictional novels
Oulipian works